Detlef Müller (born 20 August 1964) is a German train driver and politician of the Social Democratic Party (SPD) who has served as a member of the Bundestag from the state of Saxony from 2005 till 2009 and since 2014, representing the Chemnitz district.

Political career 
Müller first became a member of the Bundestag in 2014. He is a member of the Committee on Transport and Digital Infrastructure.

Since 2021, Müller has been serving as one his parliamentary group's deputy chairs, under the leadership of chairman Rolf Mützenich.

Other activities
 Business Forum of the Social Democratic Party of Germany, Member of the Political Advisory Board
 Arbitration Body of the Public Transport (SÖP), Member of the Advisory Board
 Smart Rail Connectivity Campus, Member of the Advisory Board
 Railway and Transport Union (EVG), Member

References

External links 

  
 Bundestag biography 

1964 births
Living people
Members of the Bundestag for Saxony
Members of the Bundestag 2021–2025
Members of the Bundestag 2017–2021
Members of the Bundestag 2013–2017
Members of the Bundestag 2005–2009
Members of the Bundestag for the Social Democratic Party of Germany